Takasago Maru was a passenger-cargo liner of OSK Line which later transferred to the Imperial Japanese Navy as a hospital ship.

Construction and career 
She was laid down on 9 June 1936 and launched on 1 December 1936 by Mitsubishi Heavy Industries in Nagasaki. She was commissioned on 28 April 1937 into the Mitsui OSK Line.

Throughout 1937 to 1941, she made trips to Kobe, Keelung and Moji.

On 12 November 1941, she was acquired by the Imperial Japanese Navy and converted to a hospital ship by Kure Naval Arsenal on 1 December. On 14 June 1941, she carried 500 patients while being escorted by the cruiser . On 15 June, Rear Admiral Matome Ugaki departed the battleship  to pay a visit aboard  and Takasago Maru. She was attacked by aircraft but no damage was sustained from it while anchored off Shortland on 1 November of the same year.

Takasago Maru was escorted by the destroyer  as they arrived at Truk on 5 September 1943. On 18 December, she transferred medical supplies to the cruiser  at Harujima. She departed Singapore on 28 February 1944 for Saigon. The supply ship  replenish with Takasago Maru on 17 April.

 encountered Takasago Maru on 5 February 1945 and was let go as she was clearly marked as a hospital ship. On 19 March, she was anchored near the battleships  and  during the attack on Kure and escaped the harbor undamaged.  conducted an onboard search for violations and contrabands but found her to be clear and let her continue to Wake Island on 2 July. Same thing happened again five days later on 7 July, when  conducted a search. While she was in Maizuru on 25 July, planes from the aircraft carrier  attacked the harbor but with no hits on Takasago Maru. On 1 December, she was assigned to the Allied Repatriation Service at Kure.

Between 1947 and 1956, she made trips to evacuate Japanese prisoners of war in Siberia and Nakhodka. On 23 March 1956, she was sold to Namura Shipbuilding, K. K., Osaka for scrapping.

Gallery

References

External links

Steamships
Ocean liners
Hospital ships
World War II merchant ships of Japan
1936 ships